PSR J1302−6350 is a pulsar and member of an eclipsing binary star system with the blue O9.5Ve-class star LS 2883. The pair has an eccentric orbit that is inclined to the line of sight from Earth by about 36°, leading to a 40-day-long eclipse each time the pulsar passes behind the star. It emits very high energy gamma rays that vary on a time scale of several days.

The star LS 2883 has about 10 solar masses and is 6 solar radii in size. The rate of rotation is about 280 km/s at the equator, or 70% of the breakup velocity.

References

External links
 http://jumk.de/astronomie/special-stars/psr-b-1259-63.shtml
 TeVCat 2.0: PSR B1259-63

Centaurus (constellation)
07.5
O-type main-sequence stars
Emission-line stars
Eclipsing binaries
Durchmusterung objects